Pepeng Kuryente: Man with a Thousand Volts is a 1988 Filipino science fiction action film written and directed by Jose Yandóc and starring Ramon Revilla as the titular character. Also starring are Ramon "Bong" Revilla Jr., Dante Rivero, Marissa Delgado, Ramon Zamora, Melissa Mendez, Gwen Avila, Alicia Alonzo, Cecille "Dabiana" Iñigo, and George Estregan Jr. Produced by Imus Productions, Pepeng Kuryente was released on November 16, 1988. Critic Lav Diaz gave the film a negative review, criticizing its lack of direction, slow pace, superfluous scenes, and constant product placement.

Cast
Ramon Revilla as Pepeng Kuryente
Ramon "Bong" Revilla Jr. as young Pepe
Dante Rivero as Dennis
Marissa Delgado as Marcelina
Ramon Zamora as Bruno
Melissa Mendez as Isabel
Gwen Avila as Maricris
Alicia Alonzo as Aling Rosa
Rose Ann Gonzales as young Maricris
Cecille "Dabiana" Iñigo as court clerk
George Estregan Jr. as young Richard
Baldo Marro as inmate (young Pepe and young Siso's arch-enemy)
King Gutierrez as inmate (Pepe and Siso's arch-enemy)
Rodolfo "Boy" Garcia as Mang Doro
Palito as Toothpick
Lito Anzures as Bo. Captain of Julugan, Tanza, Cavite
Bomber Moran as Lucas
Lucita Soriano as Mang Doro's Wife
Marco Polo as young Siso
Edwin Reyes as Anselmo
Renato del Prado as Siso
Ingrid Salas as Auntie Juana
Johnny Delgado as Richard
Amay Bisaya as Bisaya
Augusto Victa as the judge
Miniong Alvarez as Miniong

Release
Pepeng Kuryente was released on November 16, 1988.

Critical response
Lav Diaz, writing for the Manila Standard, criticized the film's slow pace, lack of direction, filler situations (e.g. burning of the beach house), and constant product placement for the beer brand Carlsberg. Diaz also noted that though the film's Lola Basyang-like tone could appeal to children, its violence makes it inappropriate.

Cancelled TV Adaptation 
There was supposed to be a TV adaptation of Pepeng Kuryente like Tiagong Akyat, Elias Paniki, and many more in the series Agimat: Ang Mga Alamat ni Ramon Revilla. It was also supposed to star Ejay Falcon just like stated in this article.

References

External links

1988 films
1980s science fiction action films
1980s science fiction films
1988 action films
Filipino-language films
Philippine science fiction action films